1979 Empress's Cup Final was the 1st final of the Empress's Cup competition. The final was played at Mitsubishi Yowa Sugamo Ground in Tokyo on March 23, 1980. FC Jinnan won the championship.

Overview
FC Jinnan won their 1st title, by defeating Takatsuki FC 2–1.

Match details

See also
1979 Empress's Cup

References

Empress's Cup
1979 in Japanese women's football